Catherine Anne Lozupone (born 1975) is an American microbiologist who specializes in bacteria and how they impact human health. Her noted work in trying to determine what constitutes "normal" gut bacteria, led to her creation of the UniFrac algorithm, used by researchers to plot the relationships between microbial communities in the human body.

Biography
Catherine A. Lozupone earned a Bachelor of Science from Villanova University in 1997 and went on to obtain a master's degree from Colorado State University in Fort Collins, Colorado in 1999. She went on to complete her doctoral work at the University of Colorado Boulder studying under Rob Knight, who is the founder of the American Gut Project. At the time of her doctoral research, little was known about the microbiome (genes of the bacteria, archaea, microscopic eukaryotes, and viruses interacting in an environment) of the gut and the symbiotic relationship between host and bacteria. Her thesis delineated the UniFrac algorithm which has allowed researchers to visualize the relationships between microbial communities in the human gut, how they interact, and how they might be related to specific diseases. Lozupone's work, detailed in a 2012 paper which appeared in Nature entitled "Diversity, Stability and Resilience of the Human Gut Microbiota", was noted for its attempt to analyze what is the "normal"  bacterial state in the human gut. By approaching the gut as an ecosystem, scientists are then able to factor in the effects of lifestyle, diet, health status which might change the bacterial makeup present in the gastrointestinal tract.

In 2013, after completing her post-doctoral research in Knight's lab, Lozupone started her own lab at the University of Colorado Denver, where she works in the Department of Biomedical Informatics as an associate professor. She has begun evaluating the composition differences in the microbiome of healthy individuals versus those of HIV positive individuals. She is attempting to determine if T cell loss causes change in the bacteria levels, thus prompting chronic inflammation for people living with HIV. According to Thomson Reuters, Lozupone was one of the most cited researchers in the world in 2014.

Selected work

References

Bibliography

External links 
HuffPost Live interview with Catherine Lozupone
WorldCat Publications
University of Colorado, extended publications list

1975 births
Living people
American microbiologists
Villanova University alumni
Colorado State University alumni
University of Colorado Boulder alumni
University of Colorado Denver faculty
21st-century American women scientists
21st-century American scientists
American women academics